The 1906 Navy Midshipmen football team represented the United States Naval Academy during the 1906 college football season. In their third season under Paul Dashiell, the Midshipmen compiled an 8–2–2 record, shut out nine opponents (including a scoreless tie with Bucknell), and outscored all opponents by a combined score of 149 to 14.

Schedule

References

Navy
Navy Midshipmen football seasons
Navy Midshipmen football